Muhanad Madyen (born 25 March 1994) is a Libyan footballer who plays as a midfielder .

References

External links
 
 

1994 births
Living people
Libyan footballers
Libyan expatriate footballers
Libya international footballers
Rafik Sorman players
Al-Hilal SC (Benghazi) players
Olympic Azzaweya SC players
Al-Ahli SC (Tripoli) players
Étoile Sportive du Sahel players
Khaleej FC players
Naft Al-Basra SC players
Association football midfielders
Tunisian Ligue Professionnelle 1 players
Saudi First Division League players
Expatriate footballers in Tunisia
Libyan expatriate sportspeople in Tunisia
Expatriate footballers in Saudi Arabia
Libyan expatriate sportspeople in Saudi Arabia
Expatriate footballers in Iraq
Libyan expatriate sportspeople in Iraq
Libyan Premier League players